Kang Yu-mi (born 5 October 1991) is a South Korean footballer who plays as a midfielder or a forward for Hwacheon KSPO and the South Korea national team.

Early life and career
Kang grew up in Tokyo, where she went by the name Ōmura Yumi. She moved to South Korea on her own at the age of 17 to attend Dongsan Information Industry High School in Seoul. After graduating high school, she attended Hanyang Women's University.

International career
Kang was part of the under-20 team that finished runners-up at the 2009 AFC U-19 Women's Championship and third at the 2010 FIFA U-20 Women's World Cup. On 5 April 2015, she made her senior debut in a 1–0 win over Russia. On 30 April 2015, she was named in the squad for the 2015 FIFA Women's World Cup in Canada. On 4 June 2016, she scored her first goal in a 5–0 victory against Myanmar.

International goals

Honours

Club
Incheon Hyundai Steel Red Angels
WK League: 2013, 2014

References

External links

Kang Yu-mi at the Korea Football Association (KFA)
Kang Yu-mi at the Korea Women's Football Federation (KWFF)

1991 births
Living people
South Korean women's footballers
South Korea women's international footballers
2015 FIFA Women's World Cup players
WK League players
Women's association football midfielders
Incheon Hyundai Steel Red Angels WFC players
2019 FIFA Women's World Cup players
South Korea women's under-20 international footballers
Zainichi Korean people